Lucas Galdino de Paiva, or simply Lucão, (born June 28, 1990 in Rio de Janeiro) is a Brazilian central back.

Career

Early life
Lucas Galdino is Sheriff generation born in 1990 who played in the youth team of Flamengo in 2007. Grand Commander of the back four, the team captain is also part of the cast of the Brazilian national team category, and participated in the 2007 Pan American Games, and the Campeonatos Mundial and the South American Under-17 Football Championship.

Youth career
The defender began his career at six years old, in Bangu, adjacent to the goalkeeper Marcelo Carné. From there, he was acting in futsal for Fluminense. But if it was signed in the field and at Flamengo youth team, where he plays alongside major players such as Vinícius Paquetá, Guilherme Camacho and Michael, all great promise in red and black football.

Flamengo
Made his first workout in first team in 2008 in a triangular organized by the then coach of the Flamengo Caio Júnior.

Curiosity
Another curious information about the central back Lucas is for his agent, is the former player Bebeto  who underwent major clubs, including Flamengo, took the championship and 1994 FIFA World Cup with the Brazil national football team.

Career statistics
(Correct )

according to combined sources on the Flamengo official website and Flaestatística.

Honours

Youth
 Flamengo
Campeonato Carioca de Juvenis: 2006

Contract
Flamengo.

References

External links
ogol 
Player Profile @ Flapédia 

1990 births
Living people
Footballers from Rio de Janeiro (city)
Brazilian footballers
CR Flamengo footballers
Duque de Caxias Futebol Clube players
Macaé Esporte Futebol Clube players
Association football defenders